Konsta Rasimus (born 15 December 1990) is a Finnish professional footballer who currently plays for the Veikkausliiga side FC Honka in Finland.  Rasimus was selected to the Veikkausliiga Team of the Month for June 2018 while playing for FC Honka and again for Team of the Month for September 2018.

References
Guardian Football

External links

1990 births
Living people
FC Honka players
Finnish footballers
Veikkausliiga players
Pallohonka players
Association football midfielders
Footballers from Helsinki
21st-century Finnish people